Marco Villa (born February 8, 1969 in Abbiategrasso) is a road bicycle and track cyclist from Italy. He won the bronze medal in the men's Madison at the 2000 Summer Olympics in Sydney, Australia alongside Silvio Martinello. He is a professional rider since 1993.

References
 

1969 births
Living people
People from Abbiategrasso
Italian male cyclists
Cyclists at the 2000 Summer Olympics
Olympic cyclists of Italy
Olympic bronze medalists for Italy
Olympic medalists in cycling
UCI Track Cycling World Champions (men)
Cyclists from the Metropolitan City of Milan
Medalists at the 2000 Summer Olympics
Italian track cyclists